The  (English: Imperial High Commercial Court), abbreviated to ROHG, was a German supreme court in Leipzig primarily dealing with appeals concerning commercial law.

History of the court

Historical background 

Initiatives for the establishment of a federal supreme court 
The German Confederation did not establish a federal supreme court, because the Confederation left the sovereignty of the individual territories and states largely untouched. But due to the lack of a federal supreme court, some concern existed regarding the further fragmentation of the law in the German territories. The   therefore called in 1860, 1861, 1863, 1864 and 1867 for the establishment of such a supreme court. In 1860 the German Jurist Forum argued, that at least for the unified areas of law – meaning commercial law and the law on promissory notes – a federal supreme court would be necessary to ensure a uniform development of the law.

Legislative process 
Saxony introduced its bill on 23 February 1869 and probably coordinated it with Prussia. During the parliamentary deliberations Johannes von Miquel notably argued with a view to a possible German unification that "from a legal point of view, this Court is provisional, but from a national point of view, it is definitive".

Establishment of the court 

The  (abbreviated BOHG) was created by its federal establishment law of 12 June 1869. The court constituted itself on 5 August 1870 in Leipzig, on the same day its establishment law entered into force. The seat of the court also was at the Georgenhalle.

Life of the court 
It was renamed  (ROGH) on 2 September 1871. The court had jurisdiction primarily over disputes relating to commercial law and the law on promissory notes. The court's jurisdiction was subsequently expanded both geographically and in terms of subject matter. After 1871, it took the place of the French Court of Cassation in criminal cases from Alsace-Lorraine. In its practise the court had to apply about 30 different procedural codes. 

For the member states, it replaced the corresponding higher courts of the individual  and free cities in the subject-matter jurisdiction exclusively assigned to it. The judgements of the court were initially issued  ("in the name of the North German Confederation"), later  ("in the name of the German Empire").

Succession of the court 

Historical assessment of the court 
The case law of the  had a lasting influence on the practice and teaching of German promissory notes law and commercial law in general. As a judge of the court, Levin Goldschmidt argued that it was the natural task of the court to preserve unity in the application of the law and to further the development of the unified areas of law. Due to the expansion of its subject-matter jurisdiction many contemporaries saw the court not as a special court for commercial law but as a general supreme court, a view that is shared by commentators today.

Regina Ogorek has argued that the court marked the institutional beginning of the end of an epoch of fragmentation in the law.

Organisation of the court

Panels of the  
Originally the  had no panels, the decisions therefore had to be taken in plenary sessions. This was rectified with effect from 1 September 1871 when the court formed two panels. The first panel  was chaired by the court's president, Heinrich Eduard von Pape, while the second panel  was led by its vice president August Drechsler. On 9 July 1874 a third panel  was formed and chaired by Karl Hocheder, who also became a vice president of the court. The president distributed the cases to the individual panels. To render a decision seven judges had to participate in the case and a majority for the decision had to be found.

Lawyers before the court 
No singular admission existed for the court.

Jurisdiction 
The  could hear appeals when it had local and subject-matter jurisdiction. If it was competent to hear an appeal, it replaced the supreme court of the respective member state for this case.

Local jurisdiction 
In 1869 the local jurisdiction of the court extended throughout the North German Confederation. During the time of the short-lived German confederation in 1870 its territory was the court's territory until the German confederation was succeeded by the German Empire in 1871. Correspondingly the local jurisdiction of the court was now the Empire's territory. The last extension of the court's local jurisdiction happened on 14 June 1871, when the  succeeded the French Court of Cassation for appeals concerning cases originating from Alsace-Lorraine.

Subject-matter jurisdiction 
As the name of the court suggests it was originally conceived as a civil court for commercial law matters. Accordingly, its subject-matter jurisdiction only extended to cases concerning question of commercial law. Section 13 of the court's establishment statue elaborated what specific commercial law questions were covered. Later the court's subject-matter jurisdiction was rapidly expanded by statute. For example, matters concerning copyright law, patent law and trademark law were added to the court's docket. But not only newly developing matters like intellectual property law were added, even some specific matters of general civil law – for example matters concerning strict liability for operators of trains – were added to its subject-matter jurisdiction. The court was even granted jurisdiction for some criminal law matters, but private law remained firmly at the centre of the court's jurisdiction.

Collection of decisions 
Of those 12,173 decisions, the court identified 2,764 (22.7%) as its most important decisions and published them in its authoritative collection "Entscheidungen des Reichsoberhandelsgerichts" (25 volumes). A. Stegemann also collected and published some cases of the court in the 8 volumes of "Die Rechtsprechung des deutschen Oberhandelsgerichtes zu Leipzig".

Judges of the court 

During the nine years of its existence, the  had only one president, Heinrich Eduard von Pape, who had already been involved in the legislative preparations for the court. The court had two vice-presidents – August Drechsler and Karl Hocheder (the latter joining it in 1873) – and 29 judges  in total. The formal requirement to become a judge was the eligibility to serve at a high court in one of a member states or to be a professor of law in Germany, Levin Goldschmidt being the only professor of law serving at the court. All judges of the court had life tenure.

President of the court

Vice-presidents of the court

Members of the court

References

Sources

Further reading

External links 
 
 .
 .
 .

Defunct courts
Legal history of Germany
Former supreme courts
Courts in Germany
Courts and tribunals established in 1870
Courts and tribunals disestablished in 1879